T-complex protein 1 subunit gamma is a protein that in humans is encoded by the CCT3 gene.

Function 

This gene encodes a molecular chaperone that is member of the TRiC complex. This complex consists of two identical stacked rings, each containing eight different proteins. Unfolded polypeptides enter the central cavity of the complex and are folded in an ATP-dependent manner. The complex folds various proteins, including actin and tubulin. Alternate transcriptional splice variants, encoding different isoforms, have been characterized.

Interactions 

CCT3 has been shown to interact with PPP4C.

References

External links

Further reading